Moshi Monsters was a British web browser massively multiplayer online role-playing game (MMORPG) aimed at children aged 6–12, with over 80 million registered users in 150 territories worldwide. Users could choose from one of six virtual pet monsters (Katsuma, Poppet, Furi, Zommer, Luvli, and Diavlo) they could create, name and nurture. Once their pet had been customized, players could navigate their way around Monstro City, take daily puzzle challenges to earn 'Rox' (a virtual currency), play games, personalize their room and communicate with other users in a safe environment, although this has been disputed.

The servers for the game were officially closed on December 13, 2019, due to the game requiring Adobe Flash Player, which ended support on 31 December 2020.

Mind Candy continues to actively use the "Moshi" intellectual property in the mobile app Moshi, an app featuring bedtime stories and guided mindfulness meditations aimed at children.

History
The game was created in late 2007 by Michael Acton Smith, and developed in 2008 by entertainment company Mind Candy and officially launched in April 2008. As of December 2009, there were at least 10 million players registered. In March 2010, Mind Candy announced that there were 15 million users and by September 2010, that number had surpassed 25 million. In June 2011, it was announced that there were 50 million users.  On 13 November 2019, it was announced that Moshi Monsters would be closing down on 13 December 2019, due to the end of support for Adobe Flash Player.

Gameplay

Moshlings
The Monsters (in-game pets) keep their own pets, called "Moshlings". They came in a variety of themed sets, including Arties, Beasties, Kitties, and Spookies. Those who were not paying members could keep two "Moshlings" in their room, whilst paying members could keep up to six and visit other pets in the zoo.

Other

Merchandise
Since its digital popularity, Moshi Monsters has grown commercially to include physical products, including games, toys, the Moshi Monsters Magazine (number one selling children's magazine in the UK in 2011), a best-selling DS video game, 2 music albums, books, membership cards, bath soap, chocolate advent calendars, trading cards, figures of many Moshlings, mobile games, and a Moshi Monsters feature film. Eight Moshi Monsters toys were included in McDonald's Happy Meals in the United States and Canada in December 2013. The toys were exclusively available at Toys "R" Us.

Nintendo DS games
In November 2011, Activision released Moshi Monsters: Moshling Zoo for the Nintendo DS. The game is themed around moshlings and collecting and caring for them. It also came with an unlock code for a secret moshling to adopt in the main online game.

In October 2012, they also released Moshi Monsters: Moshling Theme Park. The game takes place after the events of the previous title, and its plot involves the Monsters going to Moshlings Theme Park so that they can take a break from looking after the Moshling Zoo, only to get their plane hit by thunder and to find out that the park is now abandoned in terrible condition, so they attempt to restore it to its former glory. Like the previous game, it also had a secret moshling unlock code.

Mobile games
In July 2013, Mind Candy released Moshi Monsters Village on Google Play, a 3D city-builder published by GREE and developed by Tag Games. After GREE UK shut down, Mind Candy decided to take over the game as the publisher, leaving the development to Tag Games. The game was relaunched on Apple devices on 18 December 2013 immediately ahead of the release of the movie.

In December 2013, Mind Candy published the companion app Talking Poppet, also developed by Tag Games.

In February 2014, Moshi Karts was released on iOS by Mind Candy.

In June 2014, Moshling Rescue a "match-three" game based on the Moshling characters was released on iOS and Android.

In early 2015, Mind Candy released an app called World of Warriors which was shut down in October 2018.

In November 2016, Mind Candy released the Moshi Monsters Egg Hunt app, alongside a companion storybook of the same name.

In December 2017, Mind Candy released Moshi Twilight, an app featuring audio-based bedtime stories. The app was later renamed Moshi and expanded to include guided mindfulness meditations.

Music
In March 2012, Mind Candy confirmed a major partnership deal with Sony Music. The deal followed the recent launch of Mind Candy's own music label, Moshi Monsters Music. The deal saw Sony Music handle the distribution aspects of Moshi Monsters music releases, starting with the debut album Moshi Monsters, Music Rox! Jason Perry, formerly with the UK rock band A and head of Moshi Music, drove the new album. The Moshi Monsters series features music from Sonic Boom Six, Beatie Wolfe, The Blackout, Portia Conn, and songs such as "Moptop Tweenybop (My Hairs Too Long)" and "Moshi Twistmas". Two albums are available on iTunes and Google Play, as well as on disc. One album contains the songs from Moshi Monsters: The Movie, and another album has some of Moshi Monsters first songs. 2 Single discs for "Moptop Tweenybop (My Hairs Too Long) and "Moshi Twistmas" were also included free with the magazines in the UK.

Movie

In 2013, Mind Candy announced a Moshi Monsters film. In September 2013, Issue 34 of the Moshi Monsters Magazine included a Moshi Music DVD with a short trailer. On 10 October 2013, a short preview of the trailer was broadcast on ITV Daybreak. Later that day, the trailer was released on MSN. The film was released on 20 December 2013 in the UK and 20 February 2014 in Australia, and was a box-office bomb in both countries. The DVD and Blu-ray were released on 14 April 2014 in the UK and 3 April 2014 in Australia.

Decline in popularity and relaunch
The developer of Moshi Monsters, Mind Candy, suffered a loss of £2.2m in 2013 due to a drop in sales from Moshi Monsters. The company's financial reports had shown that the profit declined by 34.8% from £46.9 million in 2012 to £30.6 million in 2013.

In 2015, Mind Candy revealed that they were preparing to relaunch Moshi Monsters for a younger target demographic of four to seven-year-olds, initially as animation with apps and toys to follow. However, no changes had been made to the Moshi Monsters site during its lifespan, apart from the removal of the forums section and the removal of the game.

From 2015 onwards, the decline of Moshi Monsters and the site's creator Mind Candy continued. The peak of Moshi Monsters popularity was in 2012 at £46.9m, and it continued to decline. In 2018, total revenues were £5.2m, compared with £13.2m in 2014.

Closure 
On 13 November 2019, Mind Candy announced that Moshi Monsters would be closing down on 13 December 2019 due to the end of support for Adobe Flash Player. On 13 December 2019, the game's servers had shut down as planned, and the website has been defunct ever since.

Criticism and controversies 
In October 2011, Ate My Heart Inc, representing the musician Lady Gaga, were granted an interim injunction by the High Court of Justice of England and Wales to stop Mind Candy, the parent company of Moshi Monsters, from releasing music on iTunes by a Moshi Monsters character known as Lady Goo Goo. The songs intended for release included the parody "Peppy-razzi", similar to the Lady Gaga hit "Paparazzi". Justice Vos of the High Court ruled that Lady Goo Goo could appear in the Moshi Monsters game, but that Mind Candy could not release, promote, advertise, sell, distribute, or otherwise make available "any musical work or video that purports to be performed by a character by the name of Lady Goo Goo, or that otherwise uses the name Lady Goo Goo or any variant thereon". Lady Goo Goo was later replaced with a new Moshling named Baby Rox, who is not a parody of any particular celebrity.

In 2015, both Bin Weevils and Moshi Monsters were told to change the wording of their in-app advertisements by the Advertising Standards Authority, who said that the adverts and phrases such as "The Super Moshis need YOU" pressured users to buy certain items inside the game. Mind Candy said that it took its responsibilities "very seriously with regards to how we communicate with all of our fans, especially children." It went on to say that Mind Candy had "been working with the ASA (Advertising Standards Authority) to ensure that we adhere to best practice and have made changes to the Moshi Monsters game accordingly.  We will continue to work with the ASA in any way possible."

References

2008 video games
Fictional monsters
Nintendo DS games
Nintendo DS-only games
Inactive massively multiplayer online games
Internet properties established in 2007
Internet properties disestablished in 2019
Defunct British websites
Children's websites
British entertainment websites
Mascots introduced in 2007
Virtual pets
Video games adapted into films